The Seven O'Clock Show was an Irish evening-time television show on TV3. It is a live show, and provides chat, live music, cooking, entertainment, showbiz and technology updates. It replaced Late Lunch Live. The show was pushed back to 18:00 and renamed The 6 O'Clock Show due to the return of Emmerdale and Coronation Street to TV3.

Background

The Seven O'Clock Show first began as an early afternoon show live on TV3 then called Late Lunch Live. As part of the revamp of TV3's daytime schedule due to falling audience figures an extended version of Ireland AM and Late Lunch Live replaced The Morning Show. Late Lunch Live premiered on 30 September 2013, airing every Monday to Friday from 14:00. By 2014 the show was moved to a new timeslot of 15:30 to 16:30. The programme proved successful and it was later decided to rebrand the show and to give it a primetime slot of 19:00.

The programme features in-studio guests, live performances, updates on showbiz, TV, technology, events around the country and general chat with its daily guests.

The Seven O'Clock Show is hosted by Lucy Kennedy, and Martin King are the main hosts. Claire Solan acted as a reporter in the earlier shows.

On 30 January 2015 the TV3 Group confirmed Late Lunch Live would be replaced with The Seven O'Clock Show, which premiered on 16 February 2015.

With the refresh and rebrand to The Seven O' Clock Show, Kennedy and King present the show four days a week with a rotation of presenters on Friday's edition. This includes Ray Foley and Mairead Farrell, or Lousie Duffy and Anton Savage.

Due to the return of Emmerdale and Coronation Street, the show was renamed The 6 O'Clock Show and was pushed back to 18:00. Lucy Kennedy, and Martin King remain as the main hosts.

Presenters
Lucy Kennedy (Monday to Thursday)
Martin King (Monday to Thursday)
Ray Foley (on Friday's edition)
Mairead Farrell (on Friday's edition)
Lousie Duffy (on Friday's edition)
Anton Savage (on Friday's edition)

Special contributors
 Conor Pope - Budgeting and Consumer Affairs

References

External links
 TV3 - The Seven O'Clock Show

1999 Irish television series debuts
2000s Irish television series
2010s Irish television series
Irish television talk shows
Virgin Media Television (Ireland) original programming